Quhak (also Romanized as Qūhak; also known as Ghoohak and Kūhak) is a village in Varzaq Rural District, in the Central District of Faridan County, Isfahan Province, Iran. At the 2006 census, its population was 342, in 114 families.

References 

Populated places in Faridan County